Charles Krier (16 September 1902 – 14 December 1942) was a Luxembourgian racing cyclist. He rode in the 1925 Tour de France.

References

1902 births
1942 deaths
Luxembourgian male cyclists
Place of birth missing